Healthy digestion, also called digestive health, results in the absorption of nutrients from food without distressing symptoms. Healthy digestion follows having a healthy diet, doing appropriate self-care including physical activity and exercise, minimizing activities like smoking or consuming alcoholic drinks which impair digestion, and managing any medical condition which disrupts digestion to the best of one's ability.

A person with healthy digestion will have lower risk of experiencing diarrhea, vomiting, constipation, heartburn, bloating, flatulence, and indigestion. Additionally, a person with healthy digestion will have less need of digestive medications than a person who does not have healthy digestion.

Some foods like Banana, Avocado, Melons, Oats, Yogurt quickly or completely digested than others.

Disruptions to healthy digestion
Many events can disrupt digestion. Disrupted digestion can have many symptoms, including diarrhea, constipation, heartburn, bloating, flatulence, and indigestion.

Some people have chronic medical conditions which disrupt their digestion. Other people might be taking a drug which disrupts their digestion. In those cases, the person's goals for healthy digestion might be to have their personal best possible digestion since they have other health problems to manage.

Food intolerance can disrupt digestion.

Medical treatments

Healthy lifestyle
Whenever possible, it is easier for a person to prevent digestive problems from happening rather than to seek to treat them after they begin.

Drugs and other interventions
Various drugs can relieve the symptoms of poor digestion. Laxatives counter constipation. Loperamide counters diarrhea. Antacids counter heartburn or indigestion. Simethicone counters flatulence.

Constipation can also be countered using enemas or suppositories.

Probiotics have been shown to benefit gastrointestinal disorders and are a popular treatment to promote healthy digestion.

Society and culture
Many people who seek healthcare for gastrointestinal problems are not satisfied with the treatment options which they find in conventional medicine. Because of this, people often use alternative medicine to promote healthy digestion.

Various organizations observe a "World Digestive Health Day" to share information about promoting healthy digestion.

References

Self-care
Gastroenterology